Pigtail Alley Historic District in Lumpkin, Georgia is a  historic district which was listed on the National Register of Historic Places in 1982.

It runs along both sides of Old Chestnut Road and includes small cottages and large plantation houses.

References

Historic districts on the National Register of Historic Places in Georgia (U.S. state)
National Register of Historic Places in Stewart County, Georgia
Greek Revival architecture in Georgia (U.S. state)
Victorian architecture in Georgia (U.S. state)
Neoclassical architecture in Georgia (U.S. state)